
George Caffentzis (born 1945) is an American political philosopher and an autonomist Marxist. He founded the Midnight Notes Collective, is a founder member of the co-ordinator of the Committee for Academic Freedom in Africa and a professor of philosophy at the University of Southern Maine.

Books
 Parole abusate, monete tosate e governo civile. La filosofia del denaro di John Locke, Istituto dell' Enciclopedia Italiana fondata da Giovanni Treccani, Rome, Italy, 1988.
 Clipped Coins, Abused Words and Civil Government: John Locke's Philosophy of Money (New York: Autonomedia/ Semiotext(e) Press, 1989).
 Midnight Oil: Work, Energy, War, 1973–1992, (New York: Autonomedia, 1992) (co-edited). A chapter from Midnight Oil, "Introduction to The New Enclosures," was reprinted in David Solnit (ed.), Globalize Liberation: How to Uproot the System and Build a Better World (San Francisco: City Lights Books, 2004), pp. 61–72.
 A Thousand Flowers: Social Struggles Against Structural Adjustment in African Universities, (Trenton, NJ: Africa World Press, 2000) (co-edited).
 Exciting the Industry of Mankind: George Berkeley's Philosophy of Money (Dordrecht: Kluwer Academic Publishers, 2000).
 Auroras of the Zapatistas: Local and Global Struggles in the Fourth World War, (New York: Autonomedia, 2001) (co-edited).
In Letters of Blood and Fire: Work, Machines, and Value, (Oakland: PM Press, 2013).

References

External links

 Midnight Notes Collective
 George Caffentzis' page at the University of Southern Maine
 George Caffenzis page at LibCom
 Tribute to George Caffentzis in The Commoner
 Review of 'A Thousand Flowers – Social Struggles against Structural Adjustment in African Universities' by Refilwe Senatla and Fazel Khan

Living people
American political philosophers
University of Southern Maine faculty
Autonomism
American people of Greek descent
1945 births